This is a list of the next general elections around the world in democratic polities. The general elections listed are for the government of each jurisdiction. These elections determine the Prime Minister and makeup of the legislature in a parliamentary democracy, or the president and then the legislature in a system where separate votes are taken for different tiers of government. In most jurisdictions, general elections are held between every three to five years, with presidential elections sometimes attaining six (Mexico and Russia since a 2008 amendment) or seven years (France's  until 2000).

A country's constitution may give elections a fixed timing (i.e. United States, Switzerland and Sweden) while some allow the government to dissolve Parliament and call a new vote up to a certain time limit (United Kingdom, Israel and Japan). Some constitutions may require Parliaments to elect the head of state under threat of dissolution (Greece before 2019). In most countries, the election for the representative assembly determines the government. In all of the countries in the Americas that directly elect their president, the presidential and the legislative election is held at the same time (except in Colombia, El Salvador, Haiti, and Venezuela); however, most countries in Europe split these elections and schedule them at different times.

International standards set a number of rules to judge whether the election is unfair. Some countries hold staged elections, but in most cases the election's outcome is the result of organized influence as per social choice theory. Human rights violations include "compromise of the right to participate in government through free elections", the right to freedom of association, or the right to free expression. Elections may also be unfair if unlawful political campaign financing favours particular interest groups, or if the law implicitly favors some through this means. Finally, media ownership may also create significant media bias. The National Democratic Institute also maintains a calendar of general elections.

List of next elections
In cases where an election spans multiple days or has multiple phases, the first date of the election is presented in the table below. In cases where the exact date is unspecified, the latest possible date is listed in the "Next" column.

Africa

 has not held general elections since independence in 1991.

Americas

Asia

Europe

  does not hold general elections; a new pope is elected in a conclave when the current pope dies or resigns.

Oceania

See also

Democracy Index and List of freedom indices
Election law and election fraud
History of democracy
List of controversial elections
List of current Indian chief ministers
List of current state governors in Brazil
List of current United States governors
List of the most recent elections by country
Provinces of China

Notes

References

External links

 
Next